Christian Jackson McCaffrey (born June 7, 1996) is an American football running back for the San Francisco 49ers of the National Football League (NFL). He played college football at Stanford and was drafted by the Carolina Panthers eighth overall in the 2017 NFL Draft. As a sophomore in 2015, McCaffrey was named AP College Football Player of the Year and was a finalist for the Heisman Trophy. He holds the NCAA record for most all-purpose yards in a season, with 3,864. McCaffrey holds numerous NFL and Panthers franchise records and is one of three players ever to record 1,000 rushing and 1,000 receiving yards in the same season, doing so in 2019.

Early life
Christian Jackson McCaffrey was born in Castle Rock, Colorado, on June 7, 1996, the son of former Stanford and NFL wide receiver Ed McCaffrey and former Stanford soccer star Lisa McCaffrey. He attended Regis Jesuit High School in Aurora, Colorado for his freshman year and then Valor Christian High School in Highlands Ranch, Colorado under coach Brent Vieselmeyer for the rest of his high school career. He played running back, wide receiver, cornerback, and punter. He broke numerous Colorado high school records including career total touchdowns (141), career all purpose yards (8,845), career touchdown receptions (47), and single season all-purpose yards (3,032). He was the Gatorade Football Player of the Year for Colorado in both 2012 and 2013. He also played basketball.

McCaffrey was also a standout sprinter on the track and field team. As a sophomore, he placed second in the 100-meter dash at the Mountain Vista Boulder Invitational with a career-best time of 10.75 seconds. As a junior in 2013, he finished sixth in the 100-meter dash (10.89s) and ninth in the 200-meter dash (22.17s) at the CHSAA State Meet.

Considered one of the best one hundred football players in his national high school class, he was selected as a 2014 U.S. Army All-American. He was rated by Rivals.com as a four-star recruit and was ranked as the third best all-purpose back in his class and 77th best player overall. He committed to Stanford University to play college football.

College career

2014 season

McCaffrey played in all 13 games as a true freshman for the Cardinal in 2014. He shared the backfield with Remound Wright, Barry J. Sanders, and Kelsey Young. In his collegiate debut, he had a 52-yard receiving touchdown against UC Davis. He finished the year with 300 rushing yards on 43 carries and 251 receiving yards on 17 receptions with two total touchdowns.

2015 season

McCaffrey had a breakout sophomore season in 2015. He surpassed Barry Sanders's NCAA record of 3,250 all-purpose yards, finishing with 3,864. Sanders's son Barry J. Sanders coincidentally happened to be one of McCaffrey's teammates that year. McCaffrey ranked second in the nation with 2,019 rushing yards, becoming the first Stanford player to rush for 2,000 in a season. He also set numerous other Stanford records during the season including rushing yards in a single game (243) and all-purpose yards in a game (461).

McCaffrey was a consensus All-American and was the Associated Press College Football Player of the Year, Pac-12 Player of the Year, and Paul Hornung Award winner. He also finished second to Alabama's Derrick Henry in the 2015 Heisman Trophy voting.

He set the school record for all purpose yards in a single game in the Pac-12 Championship against USC with 461 total yards.

During the 2016 Rose Bowl against Iowa, McCaffrey became the first player to rush for over 100 yards (172) and have over 100 yards receiving (109) in a Rose Bowl game. Overall, he set a new Rose Bowl record with 368 all-purpose yards, breaking the previous record set in 2012 by Wisconsin's Jared Abbrederis.

2016 season

Through the end of the 2016 regular season, McCaffrey led the nation in all purpose yards (211.6 yards per game). He led the Pac-12 in rushing yards (1,603) and ranked fourth in the nation in rushing yards per game (145.7). After being injured during the Cardinal's 42–16 loss to Washington State on October 8, McCaffrey sat out for the team's 17–10 victory in the 2016 edition of the Notre Dame-Stanford rivalry the following week. McCaffrey set a Stanford single-game rushing record with 284 rushing yards against California. McCaffrey was named to the 2016 All-Pac-12 first-team and was named the CoSIDA Academic All-American of the Year. After the season, he decided to enter the 2017 NFL Draft.

On December 19, McCaffrey announced he would not participate in the team's Sun Bowl game against North Carolina, opting to skip the game to prepare for the NFL Draft. His decision was met with mixed reactions; supporters agreed it was a smart decision, while those opposing considered the move selfish, and potentially detrimental to college football should other players follow suit. Radio host Mike Greenberg, in defense of McCaffrey, said, "Calling Christian McCaffrey a quitter for skipping an exhibition game to prepare for his career is the height of just not getting it."

Statistics

Professional career
McCaffrey received an invitation to the NFL Combine as one of the top running back prospects entering the draft and completed all of the required combine drills and participated in positional drills. He attended Stanford's Pro Day, but was satisfied with his combine numbers and only ran positional drills for the NFL scouts and representatives. McCaffrey was projected to be a first round pick by the majority of NFL experts and analysts. He was ranked the third best running back in the draft by Sports Illustrated, the fourth best running back by Pro Football Focus, and ranked the second best by NFLDraftScout.com and ESPN.

Carolina Panthers

2017 season
The Carolina Panthers selected McCaffrey in the first round with the eighth overall pick in the 2017 NFL Draft. He was the second running back taken, after fourth overall pick Leonard Fournette. 

On May 4, 2017, the Carolina Panthers signed McCaffrey to a four-year, $17.2 million contract with a signing bonus of $10.7 million.

McCaffrey made his NFL season debut in the Panthers' season-opener against the San Francisco 49ers and recorded 47 rushing yards, 38 receiving yards, and a lost fumble in a 23–3 victory. In Week 3, against the New Orleans Saints, he had nine receptions for 101 yards. In Week 5 against the Detroit Lions, McCaffrey scored his first career touchdown on a six-yard shovel pass from quarterback Cam Newton. In Week 9, against the Atlanta Falcons, he scored his first career rushing touchdown on a four-yard rush in the second quarter. In the team's Monday Night Football win over the Miami Dolphins, McCaffrey scored twice–one rushing and one receiving–and totaled 50 yards. In Week 15, in a victory over the Green Bay Packers, McCaffrey brought his season total to 73 catches and five receiving touchdowns, being the only rookie running back in NFL history with at least 70 receptions and five touchdown catches before being joined by Alvin Kamara later in the season. The following week, against the Tampa Bay Buccaneers, McCaffrey brought his catch total to 75, breaking the Panthers rookie record of 74 set by Kelvin Benjamin. He finished his rookie season with 435 rushing yards, two rushing touchdowns, 80 receptions, 651 receiving yards, and five receiving touchdowns. The Panthers made the playoffs as the #5-seed. In the Wild Card Round against the New Orleans Saints, he had 16 rushing yards, six receptions, 101 receiving yards, and one receiving touchdown in the 31–26 loss.

2018 season

In Week 2, against the Atlanta Falcons, McCaffrey recorded a career-high 14 receptions for 102 receiving yards to go along with 37 rushing yards in the 31–24 loss. In Week 3, against the Cincinnati Bengals, he had 28 carries for a career-high 184 rushing yards in the 31–21 victory. Though limited in yardage for much of the middle of the season, from Weeks 8–10 McCaffrey compiled seven touchdowns in three games (joining DeAngelo Williams in 2008 as the only other Panther with this distinction), including all of Carolina's scores in a 52–21 loss to Pittsburgh. On November 25, 2018, McCaffrey became the first Panther ever to have over 100 yards rushing and receiving in the same game. He had 125 yards rushing and 112 yards receiving in a loss to the Seattle Seahawks. The 237 yards set a Panthers franchise record for most yards from scrimmage in a game. He also was the first player since Arian Foster in 2011 to have 100+ yards and a touchdown both rushing and receiving, and the only player with 10+ receptions in such a game. During Week 15, in a Monday Night Football showdown against the 11–2 Saints, McCaffrey threw a 50-yard touchdown pass on 4th and 2 to Chris Manhertz. With 50 rushing, 50 receiving and 50 passing yards, he joined Walter Payton and Gale Sayers as the only others to achieve this. During Week 16 against the Atlanta Falcons, McCaffrey broke Matt Forte's record for most receptions by a running back in a single season, finishing with 101 rushing yards and 77 receiving yards as the Panthers lost 10–24. With the Panthers' eliminated from the playoffs, he had a limited role in the Week 17 victory over the New Orleans Saints with 40 total yards. Overall, he finished the 2018 season with 1,098 rushing yards, seven rushing touchdowns, 107 receptions, 867 receiving yards, and six receiving touchdowns. With the opposite of a Sophomore slump, McCaffrey became the Panthers franchise record holder of all-purpose yards in a season with 1,965. He was ranked 42nd by his fellow players on the NFL Top 100 Players of 2019.

2019 season

In Week 1 against the Los Angeles Rams, McCaffrey rushed 19 times for 128 yards and two touchdowns and caught 10 passes for 81 yards as the Panthers lost 27–30. He played every offensive snap and became the first player to post 10 or more receptions and 120 or more rushing yards in two career games. After losing All-Pro quarterback Cam Newton in Week 2, the Panthers beat the Arizona Cardinals 38–20 in Week 3, where McCaffrey rushed 24 times for 153 yards with a career long 76 yard touchdown and caught three passes for 35 yards. In Week 4 against the Houston Texans, McCaffrey rushed 27 times for 93 yards and one touchdown and caught 10 passes for 86 yards in the 16–10 win. In the game, McCaffrey generated 179 yards of offense while the rest of his team only generated 118 yards of offense. During Week 5 against the Jacksonville Jaguars, McCaffrey bested his career long rushing touchdown set in Week 3 with an 84-yard touchdown run. This also set a Panthers record for longest touchdown run. He finished with 176 rushing yards and 2 rushing touchdowns along with 61 receiving yards and 1 receiving touchdown, bringing it to 237 total yards as the Panthers won 34–27. In Week 6 against the Tampa Bay Buccaneers, McCaffrey rushed 22 times for 31 yards and one touchdown and caught four passes for 26 yards and one touchdown in the 37–26 win.

During Week 9 against the Tennessee Titans, McCaffrey finished with 146 rushing yards, 20 receiving yards, and 3 total touchdowns as the Panthers won 30–20. That performance helped him maintain the league lead in rushing yards and rushing touchdowns over Minnesota's Dalvin Cook he held from Week 6 to the midpoint of the season (through 8 games). McCaffrey continued his touchdown streak in Week 10 against the Green Bay Packers on the road, carrying the ball 20 times for 108 yards on the ground and one score, while hauling in six catches for 33 yards. He also fumbled for the first time this season, and was stopped just short of the goal line in a failed comeback late in the fourth quarter in the 16–24 loss. During a Week 11 29-3 loss to the Atlanta Falcons, McCaffrey finished with 121 receiving yards and 70 rushing yards; his 191 yards from scrimmage was again more than the rest of team's combined 156. He recorded his 53rd reception, breaking LaDainian Tomlinson's record for the most catches by a running back in an NFL player's first three seasons. In Week 12, against the New Orleans Saints, he totaled 133 scrimmage yards (64 rushing, 69 receiving), a rushing touchdown, and a receiving touchdown. In Week 15 against the Seattle Seahawks, McCaffrey rushed 19 times for 87 yards and two touchdowns and caught eight passes for 88 yards during the 30–24 loss. In Week 16 against the Indianapolis Colts, McCaffrey rushed 13 times for 54 yards and caught 15 passes for 119 yards during the 38–6 loss. In Week 17 against the New Orleans Saints, McCaffrey rushed nine times for 26 yards and a touchdown and caught seven passes for 72 yards in the 42–10 loss. During the game, McCaffrey joined Roger Craig and Marshall Faulk as the only players to have 1,000 yards rushing and receiving in the same season.

McCaffrey finished the 2019 season with 1,387 rushing yards and 15 rushing touchdowns to go along with 116 receptions for 1,005 receiving yards and four receiving touchdowns. This performance led to McCaffrey being selected for his first Pro Bowl, played on January 26, 2020. He earned First-team All-Pro honors. McCaffrey finished third in Offensive Player of the Year voting. He accounted for 43% of his team's offensive yards during the season, the largest percentage of any individual player in the NFL. He was ranked sixth by his fellow players on the NFL Top 100 Players of 2020.

2020 season
On April 16, 2020, McCaffrey signed a four-year, $64 million contract extension with the Panthers through the 2025 season, making him the highest-paid running back in NFL history.

In Week 1, McCaffrey carried the ball 23 times for 96 yards and two rushing touchdowns and caught three of four targets for 38 receiving yards in a 34–30 home loss to the Las Vegas Raiders. In Week 2 against the Tampa Bay Buccaneers, he totaled 88 scrimmage yards and two rushing touchdowns in the 31–17 loss. When McCaffrey rushed for his second touchdown early in the fourth quarter, he suffered a high ankle sprain and missed the rest of the game. He was placed on injured reserve on September 23. He was activated on November 7 prior to Week 9.
In Week 9 against the Kansas City Chiefs, McCaffrey recorded 69 rushing yards and a rushing touchdown and 82 receiving yards and a receiving touchdown during the 33–31 loss. During the game, McCaffrey suffered a shoulder injury and was later ruled out of the Panthers’ following game and later the remainder of the season. He was ranked 44th by his fellow players on the NFL Top 100 Players of 2021.

2021 season
McCaffrey started the 2021 season promising with 177 scrimmage yards in Week 1 against the New York Jets and 137 scrimmage yards in Week 2 against the New Orleans Saints. In Week 3, McCaffrey suffered a hamstring injury that kept him out the next two games. Despite returning to practice prior to Week 6, he was placed on injured reserve on October 16. He was activated on November 6 for Week 9. He went over 100 scrimmage yards in the following three games. On November 29, the Panthers announced that McCaffrey will miss the remainder of the season with an ankle injury he suffered during the Panthers Week 12 loss to the Miami Dolphins. He finished the 2021 season with 442 rushing yards, 343 receiving yards, and two total touchdowns in seven games.

2022 season
In the season opener against the Cleveland Browns, McCaffrey had 14 touches to produce 57 yards and one touchdown in a 24–26 defeat. Through the first six games with the Panthers, McCaffrey had 393 rushing yards, 277 receiving yards, three total touchdowns, and 670 scrimmage yards.

San Francisco 49ers
McCaffrey was traded to the San Francisco 49ers on October 20, 2022, in exchange for a second, third, and fourth round pick in the 2023 NFL Draft, and a fifth round pick in the 2024 NFL Draft.

McCaffery made his 49ers debut in Week 7 against the Kansas City Chiefs, where he had 38 rushing yards and 24 receiving yards in the 44–23 loss. In Week 8 against the Los Angeles Rams, McCaffrey became the first 49ers running back to record passing, rushing, and receiving touchdowns in the same game. McCaffrey was the fourth player since the 1970 merger to complete the trifecta.

NFL career statistics

Regular season

Postseason

NFL records
Most receptions by a running back in a single season (116)
Only running back to have two seasons with 100 or more receptions
First player in NFL history to record over 1,000 rushing yards and 500 receiving yards in the first 10 games of a season
Only the third player in NFL history to record over 1,000 yards rushing and 1,000 yards receiving in a single season, joining Marshall Faulk and Roger Craig.
First rookie running back in NFL history with 70 receptions and five receiving touchdowns
First player in NFL history with 50 rushing and 50 receiving yards in five consecutive games
Most receptions by a running back in first 3 seasons with 303 receptions
Only the second running back in NFL history with 2000+ receiving yards in his first 42 games (shared with Herschel Walker)
Only the second player in NFL history with at least 20 rushing TDs and at least 15 receiving TDs through their first three seasons
Third most scrimmage yards in a single season in NFL history (2,392)

Panthers records
 Single-season records for most receptions by any player (116)
 Single-season records for most scrimmage yards by any player (2,392)
 First player in Panthers history to reach 2,000 yards from scrimmage in a season
 Most scrimmage yards by any player in first two seasons (3,051)
 Most scrimmage yards by any player in first three seasons (5,443)
 Single-season records for most receiving yards by a running back (1,005)
 Single-season records for most receiving touchdowns by a running back (6)
 Single-season records for most receiving first downs by a running back (41)
 Longest rush by a running back in franchise history (84 yards)
 Franchise record for receiving yards by a running back in a single game with 121 receiving yards on 11 catches

Personal life
McCaffrey's father, Ed McCaffrey, played college football at Stanford and in the NFL, mostly for the Denver Broncos, from 1991 to 2003. His mother, Lisa Sime, played soccer at Stanford. His older brother Max played football at Duke University, and then on several NFL teams as a wide receiver. His younger brother, Dylan, is a quarterback at Northern Colorado. His youngest brother, Luke, is a wide receiver at Rice University. His uncle, Billy McCaffrey, played college basketball at Duke and Vanderbilt University. His maternal grandfather is Dave Sime, an Olympic track star. In 2018, McCaffrey appeared on a commercial for the NFL, along with Jay Ajayi, Todd Gurley, and DeAndre Hopkins.

McCaffrey has been in a relationship with Miss Universe 2012 and fashion influencer Olivia Culpo since 2019.

References

External links

 
 
 San Francisco 49ers bio
 Stanford Cardinal bio

1996 births
Living people
All-American college football players
American football running backs
Carolina Panthers players
People from Castle Rock, Colorado
Players of American football from Denver
Stanford Cardinal football players
National Conference Pro Bowl players